Hasparren is a commune in the Pyrénées-Atlantiques department in south-western France. A resident of Hasparren is known as a 'Hazpandar'.

Geography

Location 
It's a commune fait partie of the Basque Province of Labourd.

The Côte Basque (Euskal Kostaldea), is 25 km to the west.

Access 
Hasparren is located on the route D 10, between La Bastide-Clairence and Cambo-les-Bains, at the crossroads with D 21, D 22 and D 23. It has got access to autoroute A 64, exit 4 near Briscous.

Hydrography 
The rivers Ardanabia and Suhihandia (a tributary of the Aran), flow through the commune.

Locations 
Eight settlements compose the Commune of Hasparren:
 Labiri  ;
 Elizaberri  ;
 la Coste (la Côte sur les cartes IGN)  ;
 Peña (Pegna sur les cartes IGN)  ;
 Minhotz  ;
 la Ville ;
 Urcuray  ;
 Bas-Labiri et Zelhaia  .

Toponymy

Ancient attestations 
It is attestested with various words: Hesperenne (1247 in Cartulaire de Bayonne) Santus Johannes de Ahesparren, Hesparren und Haesparren (the former two 1255 and 1288 in Chapitre de Bayonne), Ahezparenne (1288, Rôles Gascons), Esparren (1310, Cartulaire de Bayonne) Aezparren, Hesperren, Hasparrem and Hesparrem (1348 both in Chapitre de Bayonne), Hasparn and Haspar (1686 and 1754, Collations du Diocèse de Bayonne), Hasparre (A map of the Basque Lands) and Hazparne (19th century).

Etymology 
The toponyme Hasparren derives from the ancient Ahaitz-barren(a) > Ahaizparren(a), a composition of the Basque root ahaitz that indicates a height and barren (the interior) - and not form "Haritz barne" (Inner Oak) as the local tradition says.

Other toponyms 
The toponym Elizaberri appears with the from  Éliçaberria (1863, dictionnaire topographique Béarn-Pays basque).

The toponym Urcuray appears with the form Saint-Joseph d'Urcuraye (1662, collations du diocèse de Bayonne).

The toponym Celhay appears with the from Célay (1863, dictionnaire topographique Béarn-Pays basque).

Basque spelling 
The current Basque name is Hazparne.

Population

See also
Communes of the Pyrénées-Atlantiques department

References

External links

  HAZPARNE in the Bernardo Estornés Lasa - Auñamendi Encyclopedia (Euskomedia Fundazioa)

Communes of Pyrénées-Atlantiques
Pyrénées-Atlantiques communes articles needing translation from French Wikipedia